Driver Joseph Hughes  (1 September 1926 – 21 March 1946) of the Royal Army Service Corps was awarded the George Cross for the gallantry he displayed on 21 March 1946 in Lyemun Barracks in Hong Kong.  Notice of his award appeared in the London Gazette of 26 June 1947.  

The 19-year-old was driving a 3-ton truck full of cleared ammunition and explosives into the magazine area when it caught fire.  Knowing it could explode at any moment, he tried to remove the burning camouflage netting and, when that failed, tackled the developing blaze with fire extinguishers.  Despite his efforts the lorry exploded and Hughes died two days later of his wounds.

A plaque containing a replica of his medal and summary of his action hangs in the St. Francis Centre in the Gorbals in Glasgow, where Hughes was born.

References

External links
 CWGC: Joseph Hughes

1926 births
1946 deaths
People from Gorbals
Royal Army Service Corps soldiers
British recipients of the George Cross
British Army personnel of World War II
Accidental deaths in Hong Kong